During the 2012–13 English football season, Brentford competed in Football League One. During one of the club's most memorable seasons, the Bees took Premier League giants Chelsea to a replay in the fourth round of the FA Cup and suffered a dramatic last-minute defeat to Doncaster Rovers on the final day of the league season in a "winner takes all" match for automatic promotion to the Championship. The team rallied to beat Swindon Town in the play-off semi-finals, but were defeated by Yeovil Town in the final at Wembley Stadium.

Season summary

Pre-season 
After a 9th-place finish in League One at the end of his first season as manager of Brentford, Uwe Rösler had a desire to imprint his mark on the playing squad and remarked that the key to challenging for promotion during the 2012–13 season would be to score more goals. Despite the purchase of the club by Matthew Benham, the need to continue operating on a similar budget to recent years meant that Rösler and sporting director Mark Warburton had to reduce the size of the squad and conduct a mass clear-out, releasing stalwarts Karleigh Osborne, Marcus Bean, Sam Wood and veteran forward Gary Alexander's loan at Crawley Town was made permanent. The contracts of defenders Craig Woodman, Marcel Eger and Pim Balkestein were cancelled and six days into the season, winger Myles Weston was sold to Gillingham for an undisclosed fee.

By the end of the off-season transfer window, seven new players had been signed on permanent contracts – left back Scott Barron, central defenders Tony Craig and Harlee Dean, midfielder Adam Forshaw, winger Stuart Dallas and forwards Farid El Alagui and Paul Hayes. Three players were signed on loan – left back Jake Bidwell and midfielders Tom Adeyemi and Ryan Fredericks. Bidwell and Adeyemi remained at Griffin Park for the duration of the season.

Regular season 
Brentford began the season with a disappointing 1–0 League Cup first round defeat to Walsall and hovered around mid-table in League One, before coming into form in late October 2012. New forward Paul Hayes failed to produce regular goals and was replaced by Huddersfield Town loanee Jimmy Spencer, who in turn was replaced by Marcello Trotta. The Fulham loanee would remain with the Bees for the duration of the season. Inspired by the form of attacking midfielder Harry Forrester, an unbeaten run of 9 wins and four draws in 13 matches between 23 October 2012 and 21 January 2013 firmly established the Bees as challengers for automatic promotion, rising as high as 2nd position in the table. Headway was also made in the FA Cup during the same period, with victories over Boreham Wood, Bradford City and Southend United setting up a fourth round tie versus West London neighbours Chelsea at Griffin Park on 27 January. In a match televised on ITV, Brentford twice took the lead (through a quick-reaction Marcello Trotta finish and a Harry Forrester penalty), but the Premier League club ensured a replay when Fernando Torres pulled the score back to 2–2 with seven minutes remaining. Brentford were comfortably beaten 4–0 at Stamford Bridge in the replay, which was again televised. The match ended on a sour note when Chelsea defender David Luiz's "sickening" late shoulder charge on Bees midfielder Jake Reeves went unpunished and left Reeves concussed.

The distraction of the Chelsea FA Cup matches had an impact on Brentford's league form, but the Bees rose back into the automatic promotion places for the first time since mid-December after a 1–0 victory over Preston North End at Griffin Park on 16 March. Though his fitness was an issue, the loan signing of Charlton Athletic's Bradley Wright-Phillips helped relieve the tired strikeforce of Clayton Donaldson and Marcello Trotta. Brentford entered the final seven fixtures of the season with the prospect of playing five matches away from home. Of the away fixtures, the team came away with just one victory and drew another three, which included a tempestuous 2–2 draw with Sheffield United at Bramall Lane in which three players were sent off (Tony Craig and Clayton Donaldson for the Bees) and Bradley Wright-Phillips salvaged the draw with an 89th-minute equaliser.

The final day 

Brentford went into the final day of the season in 3rd place, two points behind 2nd place Doncaster Rovers. The chances of a shot at the League One title were slim, with Bournemouth three points ahead at the top of the table, but with a goal difference of +7 over the Bees. Brentford faced Doncaster Rovers at Griffin Park in the final match of the season and needed to win to secure automatic promotion to the Championship. If Bournemouth drew their match, Doncaster could win the League One title with a victory. The circumstances echoed those of the final day of the 2001–02 season, when the Bees needed to beat 2nd-place Reading at Griffin Park to win automatic promotion, but could only draw 1–1 and were forced to settle for the playoffs. The straight red card which central defender Tony Craig had been shown versus Sheffield United two matches previously was upheld, which meant that he was unavailable for the Doncaster Rovers match and a possible play-off semi-final first leg. Utility player and captain Kevin O'Connor, still not fully fit after nearly six months out injured, was drafted in to play in an unfamiliar centre back role.

The match versus Doncaster Rovers (played in front of a sold out 12,300 crowd at Griffin Park) was tense and mostly played in midfield. Brentford failed to break down the Rovers defence and create many clear cut chances, though the Bees began to take control in the second half. In the midst of a late Brentford siege on the Doncaster goal, Rovers forward Billy Paynter missed an opportunity to win the match when he fired wide of Simon Moore's goal. In the 94th minute, deep into five minutes' injury time and with the score still 0–0, Brentford were given the opportunity to win the match and seal automatic promotion when they were awarded a penalty after Toumani Diagouraga was "flattened" by Jamie McCombe in the penalty area.

After referee Michael Oliver awarded the penalty, loan forward Marcello Trotta grabbed the ball from manager Uwe Rösler's designated penalty taker, captain Kevin O'Connor. Trotta later recalled that "I scored my last penalty and was feeling confident, so I stepped up to take it". Trotta smashed the spot-kick against the crossbar and from the resulting breakaway, James Coppinger scored to win the match and the League One title for Doncaster Rovers. The 1–0 defeat consigned Brentford to a two-legged play-off semi-final versus Swindon Town. Manager Rösler stated after the game that he had not wanted Trotta to take the penalty, but he refused to blame Trotta and would deal with the matter internally. Captain O'Connor told reporters that he "tried to follow orders, but Trotts has gone into the zone, got the ball and he was extremely confident. What can you say? If he scores it, it's perfect but unfortunately he's missed it and it's cost us". Despite the defeat, Brentford finished the season with the best home record in League One.

Play-offs 
Ahead of the two-legged play-off semi-final versus Swindon Town, manager Uwe Rösler revealed that he would pin a list of his nominated penalty takers to the dressing room wall. With Marcello Trotta an unused substitute during the first leg, captain Kevin O'Connor (still deputising for the suspended Tony Craig) converted an injury time penalty to salvage a 1–1 draw going into the second leg at Griffin Park. The second leg proved to be a "pulsating" match, with the Bees twice opening up a two-goal lead through strikes from Clayton Donaldson and an Adam Rooney own goal. The Robins pulled the score back to 3–2 through Joe Devera after an hour, before Aden Flint powered home an injury time header to level the score at 3–3 and force extra time. The goalless extra time period gave way to a penalty shootout in which Brentford emerged victorious, with Adam Forshaw converting the decisive penalty to spark a pitch invasion and send the Bees to the play-off final versus Yeovil Town at Wembley Stadium.

Despite Brentford dominating much of the play-off final, goals from Yeovil Town's Paddy Madden and Dan Burn effectively killed the contest before half time. After pulling a goal back early in the second half through Harlee Dean and despite bringing on attacking players Bradley Wright-Phillips, Paul Hayes and Sam Saunders, Brentford could not create many chances. Yeovil Town emerged 2–1 victors (cementing a treble of victories for the Glovers over the Bees during the season) and Brentford remained in League One.

League table

Results

Pre-season

League One

Results by round

Results summary

Results

August

September

October

November

December

January

February

March

April

Football League play-offs

FA Cup

Football League Cup

Football League Trophy

Playing squad 
Players' ages are as of the opening day of the 2012–13 season.

 Source: Soccerbase

Coaching staff

Statistics

Appearances and goals
Substitute appearances in brackets.

 Players listed in italics left the club mid-season.
 Source: Soccerbase

Goalscorers 

 Players listed in italics left the club mid-season.
 Source: Soccerbase

Discipline 

 Players listed in italics left the club mid-season.
 Source: ESPN FC

Management

Summary

Transfers & loans

Kit 

|
|
|

Development Squad

Playing squad 
Players' ages are as of the opening day of the 2012–13 senior season.

 Source: brentfordfc.co.uk

Results and table

Professional Development League Two South

Middlesex Senior Charity Cup 

 Source: brentfordfc.co.uk

Summary

Awards 
 Supporters' Player of the Year: Clayton Donaldson
 Players' Player of the Year: Harlee Dean, Simon Moore
 Football League Family Excellence Award

References

Brentford F.C. seasons
Brentford